Tikunia is a nagar panchayat in Lakhimpur Kheri district in the Indian state of Uttar Pradesh.
Khairatiya village is near about 10 km from tikunia in the east side.

Location
Tikunia is very close to the boundary of Nepal, and residents have easy access to Nepal.

History 
In 2021, Lakhimpur Kheri massacre occurred on the Tikonia-Banbirpur road near Banbirpur village in the Tikunia area. It was a vehicle-ramming attack and mob lynching incident during farmers’ protest against the three farm laws passed by the BJP led Union Government. It happened on 3 October 2021 at Tikunia in Lakhimpur Kheri district, Uttar Pradesh, India resulting in deaths of eight people and injuries to 10 others. Four protesters and a journalist were run over by the car, three others were killed in the subsequent violence. Two First information reports (FIR) on the incident were filed in the Tikunia police station.

Administration and politics

Services
Tikunia police station serves the area.

Transport
Tikunia is 188 km. from the state capital Lucknow and 84.4 km from Lakhimpur Kheri. Tikunia can be reached by road following State Highway 21 (SH21).

Tikonia-Banbirpur road connects Tikunia with Banbirpur village.

Tikunia has a railway station and can be easily reached by train or UPSRTC Bus services.

External links
 Gurudwara Kaudiyala Ghat Sahib, Tikunia Kheri

References

Cities and towns in Lakhimpur Kheri district